Jonathan Anders Bagger (born August 7, 1955) is an American theoretical physicist, specializing in high energy physics and string theory. He is known for the Bagger–Lambert–Gustavsson action.

Biography 
Bagger received his bachelor's degree in 1977 from Dartmouth College. He spent the academic year 1977–1978 at the University of Cambridge as a Churchill Scholar. In 1978 he became a graduate student in physics at Princeton University, where he received his PhD in 1983. His doctoral thesis Matter Couplings in Supergravity Theories was supervised by Edward Witten. Bagger was a postdoc from 1983 to 1986 at the Stanford Linear Accelerator Center. He was from 1986 to 1989 an associate professor at Harvard University. At Johns Hopkins University he became in 1989 a full professor, holding a professorial chair there until 2014. In 2014 Bagger was appointed director of TRIUMF, Canada’s national laboratory for particle and nuclear physics.

Bagger’s research deals with high-energy physics, supersymmetry, and string theory. He was at Princeton's Institute for Advanced Study for the academic year 1985–1986 and in 1998. He was elected in 1997 a Fellow of the American Physical Society and in 2008 a Fellow of the American Association for the Advancement of Science. Bagger was an associate editor of Physical Review Letters from 1990 to 1993 and of Physical Review D from 1998 to 2007. He joined in 1997 the editorial board of the Journal of High Energy Physics and in 1998 the editorial board of Physics Reports.

On 18 June 1988 in Arlington, Vermont he married Deborah Gay Dunham.

Publications
 Wess, Julius and Bagger, Jonathan (December 1983). Supersymmetry and Supergravity. Princeton Series in Physics.  / 0-691-08556-0
 Wess, Julius and Bagger, Jonathan (March 1992). Supersymmetry and Supergravity: Revised and Expanded Edition. Princeton Series in Physics. 
 as editor:

References

External links

1955 births
Living people
Dartmouth College alumni
Princeton University alumni
American string theorists
Fellows of the American Physical Society
Fellows of the American Association for the Advancement of Science